This page documents the discography of Australian pop singer and actress, Christine Anu. Anu's albums range in genre from pop and pop rock to acoustic, children's, Christmas, live and tribute albums.

Albums

Studio albums

Live albums

Extended plays

Singles

Other singles

References

Discographies of Australian artists
Contemporary R&B discographies
Pop music discographies